Thomas Giessing (born 19 March 1961 in Rhede, North Rhine-Westphalia) is a retired West German sprinter who specialized in the 400 metres.

At the 1982 European Championships he finished eighth in the 400 metres and helped win the 4 x 400 metres relay with teammates Erwin Skamrahl, Harald Schmid and Hartmut Weber. At the 1984 Summer Olympics he ran in the first round for the relay team.

References

1961 births
Living people
People from Rhede
Sportspeople from Münster (region)
West German male sprinters
Athletes (track and field) at the 1984 Summer Olympics
Olympic athletes of West Germany
European Athletics Championships medalists